Imed Ben Younes (born 16 June 1974) is a Tunisian former football player and current coach.

He played for a few clubs in Tunisia including Étoile Sahel and CS Sfaxien and played a single season at Qatari club Al-Wakrah. After retiring in 2005, he returned in 2008 to play for Sfax Railways Sports, his first professional football club.

International career

He played for the Tunisia national football team and was a participant at the 1998 FIFA World Cup, appearing as a substitute in the 3 matches that Tunisia played. He also played for Tunisia at the 1996 Summer Olympics. His last international match was a friendly against Slovenia.

International goals

References

External links

1974 births
Tunisian footballers
Tunisian expatriate footballers
1998 FIFA World Cup players
Living people
Footballers at the 1996 Summer Olympics
Olympic footballers of Tunisia
Tunisia international footballers
Sfax Railways Sports players
Étoile Sportive du Sahel players
CS Sfaxien players
Al-Wakrah SC players
Espérance Sportive de Tunis players
EO Goulette et Kram players
1996 African Cup of Nations players
Association football forwards
Tunisian expatriate sportspeople in Qatar
Expatriate footballers in Qatar
Tunisian football managers
Étoile Sportive du Sahel managers